Some loanwords in the variant of the Hurrian language spoken in the Mitanni kingdom, during the 2nd millennium BCE, are identifiable as originating in an Indo-Aryan language; these are considered to constitute an Indo-Aryan superstrate in Mitanni (or in Mitanni Hurrian). The words in question are theonyms, proper names and technical terminology related to horses (hippological).

It is generally believed that a militarily powerful, nomadic Indo-Aryan elite, known as the Maryannu, settled in Mitanni, and came to politically dominate the indigenous population, while also adopting the Hurrian language. Such a phenomenon might be considered to form a part of the Indo-Aryan expansion.

Linguistic context
Professor Eva von Dassow concurs with the presence of Indo-Aryan terms in Mitanni vocabulary, but cautiously advises against the notion of an "Indo-Aryan takeover". Michael Witzel argues for the antiquity of the Indo-Aryan words attested in the Mitanni data, since they seem to predate linguistic developments attested in the Rigveda.

In a treaty between the Hittites and Mitanni (between Suppiluliuma and Shattiwaza, c. 1380 BC), the deities Mitra, Varuna, Indra, and Nasatya (Ashvins) are invoked. Kikkuli's horse training text (circa 1400 BC) includes technical terms such as aika (Vedic Sanskrit eka, one), tera (tri, three), panza (pañca, five), satta (sapta, seven), na (nava, nine), vartana (vartana, round). The numeral aika "one" is of particular importance because it places the superstrate in the vicinity of Indo-Aryan proper (Vedic Sanskrit eka, with regular contraction of /ai/ to [eː]) as opposed to Indo-Iranian or early Iranian (which has *aiva; compare Vedic eva "only") in general.

Another text has babru(-nnu) (babhru, brown), parita(-nnu) (palita, grey), and pinkara(-nnu) (pingala, red) for horse colours. Their chief festival was the celebration of the solstice (vishuva) which was common in most cultures in the ancient world.

The Mitanni warriors were called marya (Hurrian: maria-nnu), the term for '(young) warrior' in Sanskrit as well, formed by adding the Hurrian suffix -nnu; note 'mišta-nnu' (= miẓḍha,~ Sanskrit mīḍha) "payment (for catching a fugitive)".

Sanskritic interpretations of Mitanni names render Artashumara (artaššumara) as Arta-smara "who thinks of Arta/Ṛta", Biridashva (biridašṷa, biriiašṷa) as Prītāśva "whose horse is dear", Priyamazda (priiamazda) as Priyamedha "whose wisdom is dear", Citrarata as Citraratha "whose chariot is shining",  Indaruda/Endaruta as Indrota "helped by Indra", Shativaza (šattiṷaza) as Sātivāja "winning the race prize", Šubandu as Subandhu "having good relatives" (a name in Palestine), Tushratta (tṷišeratta, tušratta, etc.) as *tṷaišaratha, Vedic Tveṣaratha "whose chariot is vehement".

Attested words and comparisons
All of the following examples are from Witzel (2001). For the pronunciation of the sounds transcribed from cuneiform as š and z, see Proto-Semitic language#Fricatives.

Names of people

Names of gods
From treaties of Mitanni.

Horse training
From Kikkuli.

See also
 Kikkuli
 Sindoi
 Substratum in Vedic Sanskrit
 Mitanni
 Gutian language

References

Sources

Further reading

 
 
 
 
 
 

Mitanni
Mitanni
Linguistic strata
Sanskrit